Conformation in dogs refers solely to the externally visible details of a dog's structure and appearance, as defined in detail by each dog breed's written breed standard. A dog that conforms to most of the items of description in its individual breed standard is said to have good conformation. Unlike equine conformation, there are no fixed rules for dog conformation, as dogs are the most variable in appearance of any animals ("Phenotypic variation among dog breeds, whether it be in size, shape, or behavior, is greater than for any other animal"). Instead, conformation in dogs is based on the dog type from which the breed developed, along with many details that have been added to the breed standard for purposes of differentiation from other breeds, for working reasons, or for enhancing the beauty of the animals from the viewpoint of the fanciers who wrote the breed standards.

Breed standards
The breed standard for each breed of dog details desirable and undesirable attributes of appearance and temperament for an individual breed. Due to the great variability in dogs, there is no one standard of good conformation. What is good conformation for a lapdog will not be good conformation for a guard dog; good leg structure for a dog that must travel long distances will not be the same as good leg structure for dogs whose conformation requires short bursts of speed.

Breed standards are designed solely to describe the breed's history and purpose, temperament, and appearance. The breed standard is not a checkbox list of requirements, but rather a description, giving a detailed "word picture" of an idealized dog of that breed.  Requirements for documentation, genetic testing, health testing, testing for particular styles of work or fitness for particular dog sports or requirements for training are beyond the scope of a breed standard, and are instead developed as breeder guidelines by breed clubs, kennel clubs, or even by national agricultural department rules. Conformation refers solely to the externally visible details of a dog's structure and appearance, along with the dog's expected temperament, which varies for each breed or type of dog.

For details about contents of a breed's breed standard and what is considered good conformation for a particular breed, see the article about that specific breed of dog.

See also
 Canine terminology
 List of dog breeds
 Breed Groups (dog)
 Breed type
 Dog anatomy
 Fault (dog)

References

Dog shows and showing